Outerbridge Reach is a 1992 novel by American novelist Robert Stone. It was his fifth published novel.

Plot
The novel follows the story of a copywriter who enters an around-the-world solo boat race, and a filmmaker who makes him the subject of a documentary. Stone reportedly stated that it is partly based on the real-life story of Donald Crowhurst, though the novel does not mention Crowhurst by name. In a note from the author that appears in the first few attached pages preceding the work, Stone states as follows: "An episode in the book was suggested by an incident that actually occurred during a circumnavigation race in the mid-1960s.  This novel is not a reflection on that incident but fiction referring to the present day."  See Outerbridge Reach, A Novel By Robert Stone.

Achievements

Awards and honors
Outerbridge Reach was a National Book Critics Circle Award nominee.   It was also a finalist for The National Book Award.

Commercial success
Stone's novel was also a commercial success, spending nine weeks on the bestseller list in its cloth edition.

References

1998 American novels
American adventure novels
Works by Robert Stone (novelist)